Rawalakot Hawks is a franchise cricket team that represents Rawalakot, Azad Kashmir in the Kashmir Premier League. They were coached by Arshad Khan and captained by Shahid Afridi. They won the inaugural edition of the KPL by defeating Muzaffarabad Tigers in the final.

Squad

Season standings

Points table

League fixtures and results

Playoffs

Qualifier

Eliminator 2

Final

Statistics

Most runs 

Source: Score360

Most wickets 

Source: Score360

References

External links
Team Records 2021 at ESPNcricinfo

Kashmir Premier League (Pakistan)